Ryan Neil ten Doeschate (born 30 June 1980) is a former Dutch–South African cricketer who played for the Netherlands national cricket team in One Day International (ODI) and Twenty20 International (T20I) cricket. Ten Doeschate was named ICC Associate Player of the Year on a record three occasions, in 2008, 2010, and 2011.

Born and raised in South Africa, ten Doeschate signed with Essex County Cricket Club in England for the 2003 English season, qualifying through his Dutch citizenship as a domestic player. A right-handed all-rounder, he first represented the Dutch national team in the 2005 ICC Trophy, and played a number of tournaments for the side, including the 2009 World Twenty20 and 2011 World Cup. At the latter tournament, ten Doeschate scored 119 runs against England, the first ODI century by a Dutch player against a full member of the ICC.

At domestic level, ten Doeschate first established himself as a regular for Essex during the 2006 season, and was named the team's limited-overs captain for the 2014 season. He has played for a number of professional Twenty20 sides in other countries, including franchises in Australia's Big Bash, the Bangladesh Premier League, the Indian Premier League and in New Zealand, South Africa and Zimbabwe.

In September 2021, ten Doeschate announced that he would retire from professional cricket at the end of 2021. He played his final international against Namibia on 20 October 2021 during the group match in 2021 ICC Men's T20 World Cup. In December 2021 he was appointed as Kent County Cricket Club's batting coach. In November 2022, he was appointed as the fielding coach of Kolkata Knight Riders.

Early career
He matriculated at Fairbairn College in Goodwood, near Cape Town in 1998. While at school, he excelled at both rugby and cricket.

Domestic and franchise career

In 2003, Graham Gooch was on tour with Essex in South Africa and saw ten Doeschate play in a match against a Western Province second XI. Against Essex, he first excelled with the ball in a four-day game before impressing with the bat in a one-day match. Gooch's friend Peter Kirsten, one of the Western Province coaches, mentioned ten Doeschate's EU citizenship that would make him eligible to play in England.

In 2008, ten Doeschate became one of the cornerstones of a strong Essex team and enjoyed success with them, winning the Friends Provident Trophy and Pro40 Division 2. During a Clydesdale Bank 40 match against the Derbyshire Falcons, ten Doeschate scored 109 not out In 2010, ten Doeschate led the batting averages for Essex in the Friends Provident t20, scoring 296 runs in six matches at an average of 59.20.

In 2010, he signed with Tasmania for the Twenty20 Big Bash League. In January 2011, ten Doeschate was signed by Kolkata Knight Riders in the Indian Premier League 2011 Auction, becoming the first Associate player to win an IPL contract.

In 2016 he was appointed captain of Essex in  the County Championship. In his first season as captain, he led the side to promotion to the first division. The following season Essex win the Championship. In January 2020, he stepped down as the captain of Essex after leading his club for four straight seasons.

In 2015, he was signed by Dhaka Dynamites for the 2015–16 Bangladesh Premier League.

International career
In successive innings in international matches for The Netherlands in the ICC Intercontinental Cup competition in 2005 and 2006 he scored 84, 158, 138, 100 and finally 259 not out, the last innings setting a new record for the competition.

Ten Doeschate was selected in the Netherlands squad for the 2007 Cricket World Cup. In a warm-up match he took five wickets against a strong India team. He followed this up by scoring 57 runs off 74 balls. In the opening match of the 2009 ICC World Twenty20, he contributed to the shock defeat of the host nation England, taking two wickets and scoring 22 not out.

In October 2010, ten Doeschate was named the Associate and Affiliate Player of the Year at the ICC Awards in Bangalore. He had previously won this award in 2008. He won the award again in 2011.

On 14 November 2017, ten Doeschate was recalled to the Dutch side after an almost six-year absence in order to help the Dutch qualify for the 2019 Cricket World Cup. In February 2018, the International Cricket Council (ICC) named ten Doeschate as one of the ten players to watch ahead of the 2018 Cricket World Cup Qualifier tournament. In September 2019, he was named in the Dutch squad for the 2019 ICC T20 World Cup Qualifier tournament in the United Arab Emirates. Ahead of the tournament, the International Cricket Council (ICC) named him as the key player in the Dutch squad. In September 2021, he was named in the Dutch squad for the 2021 ICC Men's T20 World Cup.

Notes

References

External links
Cricket World Cup 2011 Profile

1980 births
Living people
Dutch cricketers
Dutch people of South African descent
Canterbury cricketers
Cricketers at the 2007 Cricket World Cup
Cricketers at the 2011 Cricket World Cup
Essex cricketers
Kolkata Knight Riders cricketers
Mashonaland cricketers
Netherlands One Day International cricketers
Netherlands Twenty20 International cricketers
Otago cricketers
Prime Doleshwar Sporting Club cricketers
South African cricketers
Dutch expatriate sportspeople in England
South African people of Dutch descent
Cricketers from Port Elizabeth
Tasmania cricketers
Western Province cricketers
White South African people
Karachi Kings cricketers
Essex cricket captains
Chattogram Challengers cricketers
Dhaka Dominators cricketers
Adelaide Strikers cricketers
Comilla Victorians cricketers
Balkh Legends cricketers
Rajshahi Royals cricketers
Lahore Qalandars cricketers
Nelson Mandela Bay Giants cricketers
Dutch expatriate sportspeople in Australia
South African expatriate sportspeople in Australia
South African expatriate sportspeople in England
South African expatriate sportspeople in Bangladesh
South African expatriate sportspeople in India
South African expatriate sportspeople in Pakistan
South African expatriate sportspeople in Zimbabwe
South African expatriate sportspeople in New Zealand
Dutch expatriate sportspeople in Bangladesh
Dutch expatriate sportspeople in India
Dutch expatriate sportspeople in New Zealand
Dutch expatriate sportspeople in Zimbabwe
Dutch expatriate sportspeople in Pakistan
South African cricket coaches
Dutch cricket coaches